Isodemis serpentinana is a moth of the family Tortricidae first described by Francis Walker in 1863. It is known from China (Hainan, Yunnan, Taiwan), India, Indonesia (Borneo, Java, Sumatra), New Guinea, the Philippines, Sri Lanka and Thailand.

Differentiated by related species from phallus bearing two unequal cornuti in male genitalia. Sub-apical blotch is sub-triangular.

References

Archipini